Hanna Alyaksandrauna Malyshik (née Zinchuk; ; born 4 February 1994) is a Belarusian female track and field athlete who competes in the hammer throw. She represented her country at the 2016 Summer Olympics, placing seventh in the final.

At age category level, she won several medals, starting with a gold at the 2011 European Youth Olympic Festival. She progressed to junior gold at the 2013 European Athletics Junior Championships, then under-23 gold at the 2016 European Cup Winter Throwing. She represented Belarus at the 2016 European Athletics Championships.

International competitions

1No mark in the final

References

External links

Living people
1994 births
Belarusian female hammer throwers
Olympic athletes of Belarus
Athletes (track and field) at the 2016 Summer Olympics
Universiade medalists in athletics (track and field)
Universiade silver medalists for Belarus
Medalists at the 2017 Summer Universiade
Athletes (track and field) at the 2020 Summer Olympics
People from Drahichyn District
Sportspeople from Brest Region